Live Earth Alert has been organised in the Netherlands on 7 July 2007 in addition to the worldwide event of Live Earth and had a unique character because of its length and total concept.

Background
In the Netherlands they presented and broadcast live a 24hour program 'Live Earth Alert' on 7 July 2007, the day of Live Earth from almost 08:00-08:00hrs including live-streams from all 7 continents and stadiums (in sequential other). 
All times in W.E.T., it started early Saturday-morning 07/07 and finished Sunday-morning 07/08.

Broadcast
Nederland 3 (public television station TV Netherlands 3) by BNN, NOS, LLink and 3FM (public radio station Radio 3FM)

Concept
Live Earth Alert has included worldwide reports from Dutch correspondents stationed in all 7 seven continents and also from the home-location Westerpark in Amsterdam: (Live Earth Alert), where parallel run a concert-program on stage produced by the Dutch from 12:00-23:00hrs, local time in the Netherlands.

See also
 Live Earth
 21World

References

External links
 Live Earth Alert.nl (partly in English)

2007
2007 in music
Rock festivals in the Netherlands
2007 in the Netherlands
Music festivals established in 2007